Specht is a German and Dutch surname meaning "woodpecker". Notable people with the surname include:

August Specht (1849–1923), German natural history painter
Bobby Specht (1921–1999), U.S. figure skater
Doug Specht (born 1942), Canadian footballer
Eckehard Specht (born 1953), German chemical engineering professor and thermodynamics expert
Günther Specht (1914–1945), German fighter ace in the Luftwaffe during World War II
Harald Specht (born 1951), German scientist and author, mainly known for his books about Jesus of Nazareth and early Christianity
Harry Specht (1929–1995), U.S. social worker, author, and dean (1977-1995) of the University of California, Berkeley School of Social Welfare
Johann Georg Specht (1721–1803), German civil engineer and architect
Karl-Wilhelm Specht (1894–1953), German infantry general during World War II
Léonard Specht (born 1954), French professional football player
 Lotte Specht (1911–2002), German female football pioneer 
Michele Specht (born 1973), U.S. actress, comedian, and voice actress
Minna Specht (1879–1961), German educator, socialist, and an advocate of German resistance to Nazism
Paul Specht (1895–1954), U.S. musician and dance-band leader
Raymond Specht (1924–2021), Australian plant ecologist, conservationist and academic
Richard Specht (1870–1932), Austrian lyricist, dramatist, musicologist, and writer
Sybille Specht (born 1970), mezzo-soprano
Wilhelm Specht (1907–1985), German mathematician

German-language surnames